Władysław Walter (4 June 1887 – 4 November 1959) was a Polish film actor. He appeared in more than 30 films between 1918 and 1954.

Selected filmography
 The Unthinkable (1926)
 Pod banderą miłości (1929)
 Ułani, ułani, chłopcy malowani (1932)
 Pieśniarz Warszawy (1934)
 Młody Las (1934)
 Przeor Kordecki – obrońca Częstochowy (1939)
 Kocha, lubi, szanuje (1934)
 Panienka z poste restante (1935)
 Nie miała baba kłopotu (1935)
 Złota Maska (1939)
 Border Street (1948)

References

External links

1887 births
1959 deaths
Polish male film actors
Male actors from Warsaw
Polish male stage actors
Polish cabaret performers
20th-century Polish male actors
Polish male silent film actors
20th-century comedians